Air India Football Club is an Indian professional multi-sports club known for its association football team. As an institutional club founded by Anand Prajapati in 1952, it is based in Mumbai, Maharashtra. They are sponsored by Air India, and have enjoyed success in the MDFA Elite League. The club previously competed in the I-League, then top tier of Indian football league system.

Four times champions in the local league in Mumbai, Air India are best known for nurturing youngsters into big time players. Many of these boys have played with distinction for bigger teams in the later years.

In 2005, the team qualified to the National Football League first division and then 2007 saw Air India finishing 7th and were the Mumbai Harwood Champions in 2005.

History

Formation and journey
Founded in 1952 in Bombay, Air India Football Club is one of the oldest institutional sides in the country. Since then, they became affiliated with Western India Football Association (WIFA). Though never considered as frontrunners in the I-League, the Mumbai-based club has often proved to be a thorn in the flesh for many top sides.

In leagues of Mumbai
Since their inception, Air India became a member of WIFA and later in 1983, became affiliated with Mumbai District Football Association (formerly BDFA). They participated in later editions of Bombay Harwood League alongside Maharashtra Football League.

They participated in B.D.F.A League, and W.I.F.A. Super Division from 1990 to 1999 and clinched WIFA title in 1999.

Air India also participated in MDFA Elite Division, and lifted trophies in 2009–10, 2013–14, 2014–15 and 2016–17 season. They also won Harwood league in 2000 and 2005.

National Football League seasons
They used to play in the NFL 2nd Division but got promoted to Premier Division and have maintained their position there until the formation of I-League. Generally a low budget side, Air India's best finish in the National Football League came in the 1997–1998 season, when they were placed sixth in the table and their coach Bimal Ghosh received the Best coach award.

Air India FC had been playing in the Premier Harwood League since 1980. Though it, they qualified for the National Football League in 1995. In the first season of NFL 1996, they finished 6th on the table and then 5th in 1997.

After being relegated to the second division in 1998, Air India paved their way back into the first division the next year and played in the National Football League in 2000 as well. The years 2001 to 2004 saw Air India going through a tough phase as they were playing in the second division. In 2005 the team qualified to the National Football League first division and then 2007 saw Air India finishing 7th and were the Mumbai Harwood Champions in 2005. In 1996, they emerged as the champions of Sikkim Governor's Gold Cup and they lifted the trophy again in 2006.

Present years

In 2008, Air India created history by winning the EK Nayanar Gold Cup, defeating three foreign club teams – Associação Ferroviária de Esportes of Brazil, Bayelsa FC of Nigeria and Buenos Aires De Futbal of Argentina. Interestingly Bayelsa won Nigerian Professional Football League and reached semi-finals of African Confederations Cup once. Other than Mohun Bagan A.C. (1911 IFA Shield) and East Bengal FC (ASEAN Club Championship), no other Indian club has defeated so many foreign teams to win a single tournament.

In 2012, the club emerged as the champions of the Durand Cup, which was their last trophy. On 25 February 2012, it was announced that parent company Air India do not have any plans on fulfilling the AFC Criteria required to play in the league and thus may fold the club by the end of the 2011–12 I-League season. Anthony Fernandes was appointed as interim head coach on 30 December 2012 after Godfrey Pereira was revealed to be away from the team due to salary issues. On 2 January 2013, it was confirmed that Pereira had left his post, when Air India played against Salgaocar at Duler Stadium in I-League in which, and lost the match 4–0.

They came back to the I-League, participating in the 2012–13 I-League season. On 7 April 2013, they played against Mumbai F.C. and lost 3–1. They earned 26 points in 19 league matches and finished on thirteenth position.

The club later confirmed their inability to field team for the 2013–14 I-League, and financial reasons were main factors behind it.

Crest & colours
Air India has always used a crest different from the logo of the parent company. For the 2011–12 season, however, Air India used the parent logo on both the home and away jersey.

To keep up with their image of being a sponsor of aircraft company Air India the club decided to make the colours of the club red which is the colour associated with the aircraft Air India.

Stadium

Air India have always played at the Cooperage Ground for all their home games. Between 2007 and 2013, Air India FC hosted their home games of the top tier I-League at the 5,000 seater Cooperage Ground. While renovations took place, Air India played at the Balewadi Sports Complex in Pune.

During the 2010–11 I-League season, Rajarshi Shahu Stadium in Kolhapur, hosted numerous matches of Mumbai teams due to unavailability of Cooperage Ground. Air India played its home games at this ground throughout the season.

Ownership
Since the beginning, Air India Football Club has been owned by airline company Air India which currently own a hub at Mumbai's Chhatrapati Shivaji International Airport which is where the club is located.

Kit manufacturers and shirt sponsors

Managerial history

Head coach's record

Last technical staff

Notable players
For all current and former notable Air India FC players with Wikipedia articles, see: Air India FC players.

Honours

Domestic tournaments

 National Football League 2nd Division
Champions (1): 1999–00
Runners-up (1): 2004–05
 Durand Cup
Champions (1): 2012
Sikkim Governor's Gold Cup
Champions (2): 1996, 2006
Runners-up (2): 2000, 2003
Mumbai Harwood League (MDFA Elite Division)
Champions (9): 1992, 1994, 1996, 1997–98, 1999, 2009–10, 2013–14, 2014–15, 2016–17
Runners-up (3): 1988, 2000, 2005
WIFA Super Division
Champions (1): 1999
EK Nayanar Gold Cup
Champions (1): 2008
Runners-up (1): 2012
IFA Shield
Runners-up (1): 2009
Rovers Cup
Runners-up (2): 1994, 1996
 Nadkarni Cup
Champions (8): 1984, 1991, 2005, 2006, 2009, 2017, 2018, 2019
Runners-up (6): 1983, 1988, 2001, 2010, 2014, 2015
 Air-India Millenium Cup
Champions (4): 2001, 2002, 2003, 2004
Aurungabad Mayor's Trophy
Champions (1): 2006
Kalina MLA Cup
Champions (1): 2013
Arlem Cup
Runners-up (1): 2002
Kalinga Cup
Runners-up (1): 2013
G.V. Raja Football Tournament
Runners-up (1): 2015

Other department

Field hockey
The club has its hockey team, that competed in Beighton Cup (one of the oldest field hockey tournaments in the world), and lifted the trophy in 2007 and 2010. They also appeared in Bombay Gold Cup.

Honours
 Senior National Hockey Championship
Champions (2): 2013, 2014
Runners-up (2): 2012, 2020
Third place (1): 2015
 Beighton Cup
Champions (2): 2007, 2010
Runners-up (1): 1995
Bombay Gold Cup
Champions (2): 2001, 2002
Runners-up (3): 2007, 2009, 2013
Guru Tegh Bahadur Gold Cup
Champions (3): 2008, 2010, 2015
Surjit Memorial Hockey Tournament
Champions (1): 2011
Runners-up (4): 1992, 1994, 1995, 2010
Senior Nehru Hockey Tournament
Champions (4): 1995, 1997, 2001, 2010
Runners-up (1): 1994

See also
 List of Air India FC managers
 List of Air India FC seasons
 List of football clubs in Mumbai
 Sports in Maharashtra

Notes

References

Further reading

External links
Air India FC at WorldFootball.net
Air India FC at Flashscore
 Air India Goal.com Profile
 Air India FC archive at WIFA
 Air India FC at Global Sports Archive

 
Association football clubs established in 1952
I-League clubs
Football clubs in Mumbai
1952 establishments in Bombay State
Works association football clubs in India
Air India